The Pomeranchuk instability is an instability in the shape of the Fermi surface of a material with interacting fermions, causing Landau’s Fermi liquid theory to break down. It occurs when a Landau parameter in Fermi liquid theory has a sufficiently negative value, causing deformations of the Fermi surface to be energetically favourable. It is named after the Soviet physicist Isaak Pomeranchuk.

Introduction: Landau parameter for a Fermi liquid
In a Fermi liquid, renormalized single electron propagators (ignoring spin) are 
where capital momentum letters denote four-vectors   and the Fermi surface has zero energy; poles of this function determine the quasiparticle energy-momentum dispersion relation. In the Legendre eigenbasis  the parameter  admits the expansion   Pomeranchuk's analysis revealed that each  cannot be very negative.

Stability criterion 
In a 3D isotropic Fermi liquid, consider small density fluctuations  around the Fermi momentum  where the shift in Fermi surface expands in spherical harmonics as   The energy associated with a perturbation is approximated by the functional  where   Assuming , these terms are, and so 

When the Pomeranchuk stability criterion  is satisfied, this value is positive, and the Fermi surface distortion  requires energy to form.  Otherwise,  releases energy, and will grow without bound until the model breaks down.  That process is known as Pomeranchuk instability.

In 2D, a similar analysis, with circular wave fluctuations  instead of spherical harmonics and Chebyshev polynomials instead of Legendre polynomials, shows the Pomeranchuk constraint to be  In anisotropic materials, the same qualitative result is true—for sufficiently negative Landau parameters, unstable fluctuations spontaneously destroy the Fermi surface.

Physical quantities with manifest Pomeranchuk criterion
Many physical quantities in Fermi liquid theory are simple expressions of components of Landau parameters. A few standard ones are listed here; they diverge or become unphysical beyond the quantum critical point.

Isothermal compressibility: 

Effective mass: 

Speed of first sound:

Unstable zero sound modes
The Pomeranchuk instability manifests in the dispersion relation for the zeroth sound, which describes how the localized fluctuations of the momentum density function  propagate through space and time.  

Just as the quasiparticle dispersion is given by the pole of the one-particle propagator, the zero sound dispersion relation is given by the pole of the T-channel of the vertex function  near small  Physically, this describes the propagation of an electron hole pair, which is responsible for the fluctuations in  

When  the equation can be implicitly solved for a real solution , corresponding to a real dispersion relation of oscillatory waves. 

When  the solution  is pure imaginary, corresponding to an exponential change in amplitude over time. For  the imaginary part  damping waves of zeroth sound.

Nematic phase transition
Pomeranchuk instabilities in non-relativistic systems at  cannot exist. However, instabilities at  have interesting solid state applications. Specifically, in 2D, the quadrupole moment order parameter  has nonzero vacuum expectation value in the  Pomeranchuk instability. The Fermi surface has eccentricity  and spontaneous major axis orientation . Gradual spatial variation in  forms gapless Goldstone modes, forming a nematic liquid statistically analogous to a liquid crystal. Oganesyan et al.'s analysis  of a model interaction between quadrupole moments predicts damped zero sound fluctuations of the quadrupole moment condensate for waves oblique to the ellipse axes.

The 2d square tight-binding Hubbard Hamiltonian with next-to-nearest neighbour interaction has been found by Halboth and Metzner to display instability in susceptibility of d-wave fluctuations under renormalization group flow. Thus, the Pomeranchuk instability is suspected to explain the experimentally measured anisotropy in cuprate superconductors such as LSCO and YBCO.

See also 

 Kohn anomaly
 Pomeranchuk's theorem
Lindhard theory

References

Fermions